Lorenzo Allegri (1567 – 1648) was an Italian composer, who worked at the Medici court, in Florence. He was mainly known as a lutenist, and for lute he wrote dances, sometimes with vocal parts. He was sometimes referred to as Lorenzino Todesco or Tedesco so it may be assumed he was of German origin.

References

Further reading

External links

References
Bernard Thomas, Early Dance Music No. 18, Lorenzo Allegri 8 Balli, London Pro Musica Edition, Brighton, 1991.

1567 births
1648 deaths
Italian lutenists
16th-century Italian composers
17th-century Italian composers
Italian male composers
17th-century male musicians